Bolatusha is an unincorporated community in Leake County, in the U.S. state of Mississippi.

History
The community takes its name from Bolatusha Creek, which flows near the site. A post office called Bolatusha was established in 1894, and remained in operation until 1940. In 1900, Bolatusha had a population of 24.

References

Unincorporated communities in Mississippi
Unincorporated communities in Leake County, Mississippi
Mississippi placenames of Native American origin